Saint-Martin-aux-Buneaux is a commune in the Seine-Maritime department in the Normandy region in northern France.

Geography
The northern border of the commune is marked by huge chalk cliffs rising over a pebble beach and overlooking the English Channel.

Population

Places of interest
 The church of St. Martin, dating from the sixteenth century.
 A sixteenth-century chateau.
 A stone cross from the sixteenth century.

People
Pierre Bérégovoy, French prime minister in the 1990s, lived here.

See also
Communes of the Seine-Maritime department

References

Communes of Seine-Maritime